Tazeh Qaleh (also Romanized as Tāzeh Qal‘eh; also known as Tāzeh Qal‘eh-ye Tork hā) is a village in Gholaman Rural District, Raz and Jargalan District, Bojnord County, North Khorasan Province, Iran. At the 2006 census, its population was 1,541, in 391 families.

References 

Populated places in Bojnord County